Işın is a common Turkish given name. In Turkish, işın means "beam (of light)", "ray (of light)", and "gleam". Notable people with the name include:

 Işın Karaca, Turkish pop music singer

See also
Deniz Işın

Turkish feminine given names